The General Electric/Rolls-Royce F136 was an advanced turbofan engine being developed by General Electric and Rolls-Royce plc for the Lockheed Martin F-35 Lightning II. The two companies stopped work on the project in December 2011 after failing to gather Pentagon support for further development.

Development
All early F-35s were to be powered by the Pratt & Whitney F135 but it was planned that engine contracts would be competitively tendered from Lot 6 onward. The engines selected would be either the F135 or an engine produced by the GE/RR Fighter Engine Team and designated the F136.  The GE/RR Fighter Engine Team was a co-operation between GE Aviation in Cincinnati, Ohio, United States (60% share) and Rolls-Royce in Bristol, United Kingdom and Indianapolis, Indiana, US (40% share).

On 21 July 2004, the F136 began full engine runs at GE's Evendale, Ohio facility. The engine ran for over an hour during two separate runs.  In August 2005, the United States Department of Defense awarded the GE and Rolls-Royce team a $2.4 billion contract to develop its F136 engine. The contract was for the system development and demonstration (SDD) phase of the F136 initiative, scheduled to run until September 2013.

The US Defense budget announced on 6 February 2006 excluded the F136 — leaving Pratt & Whitney, maker of the F135 engine, as the sole provider of engines for the Lockheed Martin F-35 fighters. Congress, however, overturned this request and allocated funds for FY 2007 later in 2006.  In November 2006, the General Electric/Rolls-Royce team successfully completed a 3-month preliminary design review by the F-35 Program Office and the prime contractor, Lockheed Martin.

On 13 February 2008, the GE Rolls-Royce Fighter Engine Team successfully completed its Critical Design Review (CDR) for the F136. During CDR, the U.S. Government's Joint Program Office for the F-35 Lightning II validated and approved the design of the engine. Also during the review, every aspect of the engine design was analyzed and evaluated in order to proceed with the building of the first full development engines. The process involved 80 detailed component and module design reviews, involving technical experts from the JPO, General Electric and Rolls-Royce.

On 20 March 2008, the F136 successfully completed a high-altitude afterburner testing program at the US Air Force Arnold Engineering Development Center in Tennessee, including common exhaust hardware for the F-35 Lightning II aircraft. All test objectives were reached as planned using an engine configured with Conventional Takeoff and Landing (CTOL) and Short Takeoff Vertical Landing (STOVL) common exhaust systems. The engine configuration included a production-size fan and functional augmenter allowing several run periods to full afterburner operation.  The GE Rolls-Royce Fighter Engine Team successfully completed Short Take Off, Vertical Landing (STOVL) testing on an F136 engine at the GE testing facility at Peebles, Ohio on 16 July 2008.

The first complete new-build F136 engine began testing 30 January 2009, under the System Development and Demonstration (SDD) contract with the US Government Joint Program Office for the F-35 Joint Strike Fighter program. This marked the first complete engine assembled following US Government validation of the F136 design in 2008. The milestone was achieved one month ahead of schedule.

Citing the Weapon Systems Acquisition Reform Act of 2009, the GE Rolls-Royce Fighter Engine Team submitted an unsolicited fixed-price offer for the F136 to the Pentagon on 28 September 2009. The fixed-price approach would cover initial F136 engine production, beginning with the F136 second production lot. According to the GE Rolls-Royce Fighter Engine Team, the proposal would shift significant cost risk from taxpayers to the Fighter Engine Team until head-to-head competition begins between the F136 and the Pratt & Whitney F135 engine in 2013.

From 2006 to 2010 the Defense Department has not requested funding for the alternate F136 engine program, but Congress has maintained program funding.

On 19 December 2009, U.S. Congress approved continued funding for the F136 engine program in fiscal year 2010. The U.S. Defense Department did not request FY 2010 funding for the F136 engine program.  In a report filed on 18 June 2009, the House Armed Services Committee cited Pratt & Whitney F135 engine program cost overruns of $1.872 billion as cause to continue funding the F136 engine.

On 2 November 2009, the F136 team said that they would redesign a small part of the diffuser leading to the combustor after a failure during testing. Testing resumed on January 22, 2010.  The GE Rolls-Royce Fighter Engine Team is currently in the fourth year of its System Development and Demonstration (SDD) contract with the US Government Joint Program Office. The Fighter Engine Team has totaled more than 800 hours of testing on pre-SDD and SDD engines.  In early 2010, full afterburning thrust was reached in testing of the first production standard engine.

On 24 March 2011, the Department of Defense issued a 90-day temporary stop work order after Congress failed to pass the defense budget. GE declared that it would continue work on the engine program with their own funds in spite of the stop-work order, as allowed in the order and as had been suggested by Schwartz the previous year.  However GE is limited to design work only, as the stop-work prevents their use of the existing hardware.

On 12 April 2011, GE reduced its team on project from 1,000 workers down to 100, who will work on the F136 and engine technologies for "future combat aircraft". GE will redeploy the workers to commercial projects, but will not hire the hundreds of new engineers it was expecting.  On 25 April 2011, the Department of Defense ended the contract with GE and demanded that the engines built to date be turned over.

On 5 May 2011, GE and RR offered to pay for the development through FY2012 and asked for access to the materials. By switching to self funding the cost would reduce from $480 million a year to only $100 million, 60% to be paid by GE and 40% to be paid by RR.  After self-funding the project GE and Rolls-Royce announced on 2 December 2011, that they would not continue development of the F136 engine because it is not in their best interest. By then, the six engines had logged more than 1,200 hours of testing since 2009. During the year, GE said that development of the engines was 80% complete; the remaining work would have required US$1.9-2.6 billion in funding.

Design
The F136 is a twin-spool axial-flow low-bypass turbofan. It has a 3-stage low-aspect ratio fan driven by a 3-stage low-pressure turbine, and a 5-stage compressor driven by a single-stage turbine; both the fan and compressor stages are one-piece blisks. The STOVL variant's shaft-driven LiftFan is connected to the low-pressure spool and engaged through a clutch. The low-pressure spool's 3 turbine stages enable more work to be extracted to power the LiftFan, while the conventional takeoff variant retains this architecture for commonality. The annular combustor case is made from "Lamilloy" and cooled by bleed air from the compressor. The two spools are counterrotating, eliminating the stage 1 low pressure turbine nozzle and thus reducing parts count. The vanes behind the turbines are made of ceramic matrix composites (CMC), enabling higher operating temperatures for greater efficiency and thrust. Like the competing F135, the F136 was to have a stealthy augmentor, or afterburner, that blocks line-of-sight of the turbine blades and a convergent-divergent nozzle with serrated flaps that reduce the infrared signature of the exhaust plume. During ground testing, the F136 used the same exhaust system as the F135. The engine would be controlled by a BAE-supplied full authority digital engine control (FADEC).

In the STOVL configuration, the F136 produces  of lift thrust.

Applications
 Lockheed Martin F-35 Lightning II

Specifications

See also

References

External links
 FighterEngineTeam
 GE Aircraft Engines F136 page 
 Rolls-Royce F136 page
 www.jsf.mil: F136 gallery
 www.jsf.mil: F-35 Propulsion Systems 
 
 Joint Strike Fighter: Assessment of DOD's Funding Projection for the F136 Alternate Engine

Low-bypass turbofan engines
2000s turbofan engines